Earl "Mickey" Taborn (July 21, 1922 – December 21, 1996) was an American professional baseball catcher in the Negro leagues, minor leagues and in the Mexican League. He played from 1946 to 1961 with several teams.

References

External links
 and Seamheads

1922 births
1996 deaths
Kansas City Monarchs players
Newark Bears (IL) players
Baseball players from Illinois
Sportspeople from Illinois
People from Saline County, Illinois
20th-century African-American sportspeople
Baseball catchers